The French Ambassador to Sri Lanka was created 27 October 1948 as the Extraordinary Envoy and Plenipotentiary Minister. The current ambassador is Robichon Christine who was inaugurated on 24 January 2010.

List

Extraordinary Envoy and Plenipotentiary Minister
 Pinoteau - 27 October 1948
 Robert Du Gardier - 6 July 1951
 Colin - 20 June 1953

Ambassador
 Same - (December 1958)
 Guibaut - (5 May 1959)
 Lance - (4 August 1961)
 Brionval - (26 March 1964)
 Chambon - (9 December 1968)
 Lambroschini - (4 August 1971)
 Anthonioz - (24 April 1975)
 Jacques Bourgoin - (23 January 1978)
 Toussaint - (19 September 1981)
 Morizot - (2 March 1984)
 Eluecque - (5 July 1986)
 Lambert - (8 December 1988)
 Jean-François Bouffandeau - (18 June 1992)
 Elisabeth Dahan - (11 March 1996)
 Marie-France Pagnier - (1 September 2000)
 Jean-Bernard De Vaivre - (25 September 2003 - August 2006)
 Lummaux Michel - (1 September 2006 - 18 December 2009)
 Robichon Christine - (24 January 2010 - Present)

See also
 Sri Lankan Ambassador to France

References

External links
  French embassy in Sri Lankan
 Chronological list of Ambassadors
 

Sri Lanka
Sri Lanka
France